Route 15, or Highway 15, can refer to:
For roads named A15, see A15 roads.

International
 Asian Highway 15
 European route E15 
 European route E015

Australia

New South Wales 
 Hunter Expressway
 New England Highway and other local Newcastle routes (New South Wales)

Northern Territory 
 Tiger Brennan Drive

Queensland 
 Cunningham Highway (Queensland)
 New England Highway (Queensland)

South Australia 
 - South Australia

Tasmania 
 Castra Road

Canada
 Alberta Highway 15
 British Columbia Highway 15
 Manitoba Highway 15
 New Brunswick Route 15
 Ontario Highway 15
 Prince Edward Island Route 15
 Quebec Autoroute 15
 Saskatchewan Highway 15

China 
  G15 Expressway
  G15w Expressway (G15's branch)

Czech Republic
 I/15 Highway; Czech: Silnice I/15

Djibouti
  RN-15 (Djibouti)

India
  National Highway 15 (India)

State Highway 15 (Tamil Nadu)

 State Highway 15 (West Bengal)

Iran
 Road 15

Ireland
  N15 road (Ireland)

Italy
 Autostrada A15
 RA 15

Japan
 Japan National Route 15

Jordan

Korea, South
 Seohaean Expressway
 National Route 15
Gukjido 15

Mexico
 Mexican Federal Highway 15
 Mexican Federal Highway 15D

New Zealand
 New Zealand State Highway 15

Paraguay
 National Route 15

Poland
National road 15 (Poland) runs northeast from Trzebnica to Ostróda, 395 km

Ukraine
 Highway M15 (Ukraine)

United Kingdom
 British A15 (Norman Cross-Hessle)

United States
 Interstate 15
 U.S. Route 15
 New England Route 15 (former)
 Alabama State Route 15 (former)
 Arkansas Highway 15
 California State Route 15
 County Route A15 (California)
 County Route E15 (California)
 County Route G15 (California)
 County Route J15 (California)
 County Route S15 (California)
 Colorado State Highway 15
 Connecticut Route 15
 Delaware Route 15
 Florida State Road 15
 County Road 15 (Orange County, Florida)
 County Road 15 (Seminole County, Florida)
 Georgia State Route 15
 Hawaii Route 15 (former)
 Illinois Route 15
 Indiana State Road 15
 Iowa Highway 15
 K-15 (Kansas highway)
 Kentucky Route 15
 Louisiana Highway 15
 Louisiana State Route 15 (former)
 Maine State Route 15
 Massachusetts Route 15
 M-15 (Michigan highway)
 Minnesota State Highway 15
 County Road 15 (Hennepin County, Minnesota)
 County Road 15 (Ramsey County, Minnesota)
 County Road 15 (Scott County, Minnesota)
 County Road 15 (Washington County, Minnesota)
 Mississippi Highway 15
 Missouri Route 15
 Nebraska Highway 15
 Nebraska Recreation Road 15B
 Nebraska Recreation Road 15C
 Nevada State Route 15 (former)
 New Jersey Route 15
 County Route 15 (Monmouth County, New Jersey)
 New Mexico State Road 15
 New York State Route 15
 County Route 15 (Allegany County, New York)
 County Route 15B (Allegany County, New York)
 County Route 15 (Cattaraugus County, New York)
 County Route 15 (Chautauqua County, New York)
 County Route 15 (Franklin County, New York)
 County Route 15 (Genesee County, New York)
 County Route 15 (Hamilton County, New York)
 County Route 15 (Jefferson County, New York)
 County Route 15 (Monroe County, New York)
 County Route 15 (Niagara County, New York)
 County Route 15 (Oneida County, New York)
 County Route 15 (Ontario County, New York)
 County Route 15 (Orange County, New York)
 County Route 15 (Orleans County, New York)
 County Route 15 (Oswego County, New York)
 County Route 15 (Putnam County, New York)
 County Route 15 (Rensselaer County, New York)
 County Route 15 (Rockland County, New York)
 County Route 15 (Schuyler County, New York)
 County Route 15 (Steuben County, New York)
 County Route 15 (Suffolk County, New York)
 County Route 15 (Tioga County, New York)
 County Route 15 (Ulster County, New York)
 County Route 15 (Westchester County, New York)
 County Route 15 (Wyoming County, New York)
 County Route 15 (Yates County, New York)
 North Carolina Highway 15 (former)
 North Dakota Highway 15
 Ohio State Route 15
 Oklahoma State Highway 15
 Oregon Route 15 (former)
 Pennsylvania Route 15 (former)
 Rhode Island Route 15
 South Dakota Highway 15
 South Dakota Highway 15Y (former)
 Tennessee State Route 15
 Texas State Highway 15
 Texas State Highway Loop 15
 Farm to Market Road 15
 Texas Park Road 15
 Utah State Route 15 (former)
 Vermont Route 15
 State Route 15 (Virginia 1918-1923) (former)
 State Route 15 (Virginia 1923-1933) (former)
 Washington State Road 15 (former)
 Primary State Highway 15 (Washington) (former)
 Secondary State Highway 15B (Washington) (former)
 Secondary State Highway 15C (Washington) (former)
 Secondary State Highway 15D (Washington) (former)
 West Virginia Route 15
 Wisconsin Highway 15

Territories
 Guam Highway 15
 Puerto Rico Highway 15

Uruguay
  Route 15 Javier Barrios Amorín

See also
 List of A15 roads
 List of highways numbered 15A
 List of highways numbered 15E
 List of highways numbered 15W

References